is a regional radio and television service serving Gifu prefecture, Japan.  Its radio service is an independent AM station and its television service is a member of the JAITS. The station is branded as Gifu Chan (ぎふチャン).

External links
GBS Official Website

Independent television stations in Japan
Radio in Japan
Radio stations established in 1962
Television channels and stations established in 1968